State Route 147 (SR 147) is an east-west state highway in the eastern portion of the U.S. state of Ohio. Its eastern terminus is at State Route 7 near Bellaire, with its western terminus at SR 78 in Noble County, Ohio.  The highway passes near Senecaville Lake near Batesville.

History
SR 147 was commissioned in 1923, along its current route. In 1930, the western terminus was moved to an intersection to the newly commissioned SR 146, in Sarahsville. The western terminus was moved back to its current location in 1932.

Major intersections

References

147
Transportation in Belmont County, Ohio
Transportation in Noble County, Ohio